Steve Paxton (born 1939 in Phoenix, Arizona) is an experimental dancer and choreographer. His early background was in gymnastics while his later training included three years with Merce Cunningham and a year with José Limón. As a founding member of the Judson Dance Theater, he performed works by Yvonne Rainer and Trisha Brown. He was a founding member of the experimental group Grand Union and in 1972 named and began to develop the dance form known as Contact Improvisation, a form of dance that utilizes the physical laws of friction, momentum, gravity, and inertia to explore the relationship between dancers.

Paxton believed that even an untrained dancer could contribute to the dance form, and so began his great interest in pedestrian movement. After working with Cunningham and developing chance choreography, defined as any movement being  his generation whose approach has influenced choreography globally. He attempts to remain reclusive, except when performing, teaching and choreographing internationally.

Contact improvisation 
Paxton was influenced by the experimental arts and performance scene in New York in the 1960s and 1970s, and he was interested in how the body could create a physical playground. Contact improvisation developed out of an exploration of the human body and under the supervision of Paxton. Its roots trace back to 1972. Contact improvisation, usually done in duets, pulls elements from martial arts, social dance, sports, and child’s play.  Upon entering a contact improv structure, two bodies must come together to create a point of contact (i.e., back to wrist, shoulder to thigh, head to foot, back to back, the options are endless), give weight equally to each other, and then create a movement dialog that can last for an undetermined amount of time, as long as both participants are fully engaged.

Contact improvisation can be done by any person because the emergence of a movement vocabulary depends on a specific touch and the initiation of weight exchange with another person. Paxton in the late 1970s focused on teaching, performing, and writing about contact improvisation around the country and in Europe. Contact improvisation went on to be taught around the world by people like Nancy Stark Smith, who worked closely with Paxton, and by others who had been exposed to it by different dancers, choreographers, teachers, and contact improvisers.

Approach to movement 
Paxton believed that even an untrained dancer could contribute to his experimental dance form.  From his work with Merce Cunningham and José Limón, and later his contribution to the formation of the Judson Dance Theater and Grand Union, Paxton was fascinated with the exploration of the human body.  His approach to a movement vocabulary included the pedestrian world around him.  Paxton describes the body as a physical machine that can be expressive by nature and the culture around it.<ref>Nancy Reynolds and Malcolm McCormick, No Fixed Points: Dance in the Twentieth Century (New Haven, CT: Yale University Press, 2003, 409.</ref>  With the emergence of his first dance Proxy (1961) activities in this piece such as walking, sitting, and eating would preoccupy Paxton’s approach to movement for some time.

Paxton was known for eliminating any outside influences that would prevent the piece from just being accepted how it was.  He composed a range of non-dance movement vocabulary that seemed to give him a relaxed but authoritative state of being in performance.  Paxton minimized the differences between the audience and the performer.  In turn his movement vocabulary became fragments of ‘everyday’ movement mechanics and this held a world of possibilities for individual potential.  Another piece that showed his fascination with the pedestrian world was Satisfyin’ Lover (1967).  This dance was for a group of thirty-four to eighty-four people and it utilized walking, standing, or sitting according to the score.

 Approach to the body 
Paxton not only utilized the architecture of the human body, but he also used objects to emphasize how the body could manipulate itself around different objects.  He was interested in texture, shape, size, and even how the use of animals influenced or changed his dance vocabulary. This is apparent in such pieces as Jag Ville Gorna Telefonera (1964). In this piece he used three chickens, a full-sized overstuffed chair made of cake and yellow frosting, and clothes with zippers in the seams that could be taken off and put back together in an assortment of ways.

Paxton also challenged the concept of sex and sexuality in dance.  Not only was Paxton a revolutionary to the changing world of dance around him but his experimentation with movement and the structure of the human body crafted a different version of what it was to be a dancer. He changed and challenged the aspects of traditional modern dance. Today dancers, performers, choreographers, and teachers from around the world have incorporated some form of his teachings of Contact Improvisation into their studies.

 Awards
In 1980, Paxton received a grant from the National Endowment for the Arts. Paxton received a 1994 Foundation for Contemporary Arts Grants to Artists Award, and in  1995 John Simon Guggenheim Memorial Foundation Fellowship  In 2014 Paxton was awarded the Golden Lion for Lifetime Achievement in Dance at the Venice Biennale.  In 1987 and 1995 Paxton won New York Dance and Performance "Bessie" awards, and in  2015 Paxton was awarded the Bessie for lifetime achievement.

Selected works

1961: Proxy1964: Jag Vill Gärna Telefonera1966: Physical Things1970: Intravenous Lecture1978: PA RT (with Lisa Nelson, on a music by Robert Ashley)
1986: Goldberg Variations2004: Night Stand (with Lisa Nelson)
1986-2008: Material for the SpineIn October, 2013, Paxton, considered 'a titan of the 1960s and ’70s avant-garde,' gave a rare performance of Night Stand'' with long-time collaborator, Lisa Nelson in a New York gallery; the piece was created in 2004 but had never before been performed in the United States.

References

External links 
 Archival footage of Steve Paxton performing Improvisation Project in 1998 at Jacob's Pillow
 Yvonne Rainer's Tribute to Steve Paxton
Material for the Spine website

American choreographers
American male dancers
Contemporary dance choreographers
Artists from Tucson, Arizona
Living people
1939 births
Bessie Award winners
Experiments in Art and Technology collaborating artists
Designers at National Institute of Design